Thirdmoon are a melodic black metal band from Austria.

Biography
Founded by Wolfgang Rothbauer in 1994, it was a few years before their debut Grotesque Autumnal Weepings in 1997. Later, in 1998, they gained French guitarist Matias Larrede and in 1999 they signed with Napalm Records. With Napalm Records they released Aquis Submersus (1999) and Bloodforsaken (2000). Then they went on tour with Eisregen.

In 2001 Thirdmoon split with Napalm Records and it was three years before their next release, Sworn Enemy: Heaven. In 2005 they toured with Grave and Disparaged. In April 2007 they signed a new deal with German-based Label Maintain Records for their 5th album, which was released in autumn 2007.

Discography
Grotesque Autumnal Weepings - 1997
Aquis Submersus - 1999
Bloodforsaken - 2000
Sworn Enemy: Heaven - 2004
Dimorphic Cynosure - 2007

External links
 

Austrian melodic death metal musical groups
Musical groups established in 1994